The Zamoskvoretskaya line, formerly Gorkovsko–Zamoskvoretskaya (Line 2), is a line of the Moscow Metro. Opened in 1938, chronologically it became the third line. There are 24 stations on the Zamoskvoretskaya line, and it spans , roughly crossing Moscow in a north–south direction. A normal trip along the entire line takes 55 minutes, with the trains on the line averaging . While most of the line is underground, there are some pockets of surface-level or above-ground track, mainly at the point where the line crosses the Moskva River. The line contains many examples of original Moscow Metro architecture, and contains arguably the most photographed station on the entire network: Mayakovskaya.

History
The first stage of the line followed Moscow's busiest transport artery the Leningradsky Prospekt or as it moves into the centre the Tverskaya Street (formally Gorkovskaya hence the original name), and connected the northwestern districts of Aeroport and Begovoy along with the Belorussky Rail Terminal with the city centre in 1938.

The second stage, construction of which was uninterrupted during the war, opened in 1943 and followed the Red Square south under the Moskva River into the dense district of Zamoskvorechye (hence the name) and then onto the Paveletsky Rail Terminal and more significantly the Stalin Factory (ZiS) in the Southeast of Moscow.

Several more extensions were to take place including the northern one following the Leningrad Highway and the Moscow Canal into the Northern River Port in 1964. A southern one in 1969 passed the Nagatino industrial district and the Kolomenskoye park, the rest of the extension went into the future Kakhovskaya line. In 1984 a third extension commenced in two stages to the southeast past the Tsaritsyno park and into the Orekhovo-Borisovo housing massifs. A flooded tunnel, however forced the new branch to close a day after and for the next two and a half months. In late 1985 the second stage was completed, reaching a length of 36.9 kilometres with 20 stations and a daily passenger traffic of 1.8 million people.

The line's complex and inspiring history is mirrored in its architectural ensemble, particularly as it is one of the few places that it is possible to see the best of Soviet pre-war Art Deco architecture. In the spotlight before all other stations is Mayakovskaya, a station that is not only most-photographed in the network but is also common sight on covers of brochures and tour guides into Moscow's underground realm.

When the line first opened in 1938, to distinguish the simultaneous formation of the three lines instead of one, colour-coding was introduced. The first one, the Sokolnicheskaya being Red, for mostly political reasons. However chronologically the Arbatsko-Pokrovskaya line would have been second and was coloured blue, whilst the third one Zamoskvoretskaya was given green. However as part of the Arbatsko-Pokrovskaya line was already in operation from the first stage, the significance of the Zamoskvoretskaya line was far greater. As a result the line was listed second. This tradition has since been passed on in all ex-Soviet cities with the first line being red and the second/third being either blue or green. However some metros, notably Minsk Metro chose to deliberately reverse the trend.

Since 12 November 2022, the section of the Zamoskvoretskaya line between Avtozavodskaya and Orekhovo has been closed for six months for the reconstruction of the tunnel.

Timeline

Name changes

Transfers

The Kashirskaya transfer is a cross-platform one.

Rolling stock
The line is served by the Sokol (No 2) and Zamoskvoretskoe (No 7) depots to which, respectively, 39 and 36 eight-carriage are assigned. The line began receiving 81-714/717 trains in 1980, replacing older E types in a programme which was finished in 1987. Some of these were upgraded to the .5 standard. When the Kakhovskaya branch separated from the main line, seven six-carriage trains were formed for it at the Zamoskvoretskoe depot.

Subway car types used on the line over the years:

- Series A, B: 1938 - 1951

- Series V: 1949 - 1954

- Series G: 1947 - 8th of December, 1965

- Series E: 1963 - 1989

- Series Ezh, Em-508 and Em-509: 1970 - 1989

- Series Ezh3/Em-508T: 1978 - 1983

- Series 81-717: 1979 - present

- Series 81-717.5: 1988 - present

- Series 81-717.5M: 2008 - present

Recent events and future plans
Today the line features a combination of stations that were built during different periods and some rebuilt since. Also it is one of the busiest in the system and for some stations, that are almost 70 years old clearly show their age. Improvement works have been carried out several times throughout history, but in recent times their emphasis has grown. Belorusskaya was recently subjected to an extensive facelift reconstruction on replacement of its old ceramic walls with new marble ones. The world famous Mayakovskaya station following the opening of the second exit in 2005 had its original vestibule closed for replacement of escalators. It is expected that additional reconstruction will be done on 1960s "centipede" stations including the replacement of old ceramic tiles with aluminium planes.

When the line was built several areas were left with a straight tunnel provision for potential future built in of new stations. One of which was Gorkovskaya (now Tverskaya) between Mayakovskaya and Teatralnaya, which was opened in 1979. However several more remain: Sovetskaya between Tverskaya and Teatralnaya, Bega between Dinamo and Belorusskaya, Vishnyakovsky Pereulok between Novokuznetskaya and Paveletskaya and Moskvorechye (also referred to as Vasilyevsky Spusk) between Teatralnaya and Novokuznetskaya. The latter provision stands the highest chance of being developed as the vacant space caused by demolition of the Rossiya Hotel is likely to be filled with new office buildings and hotels.

In addition to the provisions, another station was recently approved to be built on the surface level track between Avtozavodskaya and Kolomenskaya. The provisional names were Nagatinsky Zaton or Prospekt Andropova, although the name Tekhnopark was selected. The station opened in late 2014.

The Metro completed the northern extension to Khovrino in 2017, making that station the northern terminus of the line. Belomorskaya, an intermediate station, opened on December 20, 2018. The extension creates the potential to further extend the line into the adjacent Moscow Oblast town of Khimki.

References

External links

Zamoskvoretskaya Line photos & info on the Robert Schwandl's UrbanRail site
Zamoskvoretskaya Line gallery on the Urban Electric Transit

Moscow Metro lines
Railway lines opened in 1938